Jamboree, known as Disc Jockey Jamboree in the United Kingdom, is a 1957 American rock and roll film directed by Roy Lockwood. Its story is about a boy and girl, Pete Porter and Honey Wynn (played respectively by Paul Carr and Freda Holloway), who become overnight sensations as a romantic singing duo who run into trouble when their squabbling managers (Kay Medford and Bob Pastene), try to turn them into solo acts. Against this backdrop in cameo performances appear some of the biggest names of rock and roll in the 1950s lip-syncing to their recordings.

Overview

Jamboree is a film that was built upon the popularity of a name which at the time was becoming associated with rock and roll music and it appears to have derived its name from a show starring disc-jockey Alan Freed that began airing over Radio Luxembourg in 1956 (the year before this movie was released). Freed recorded his featured segment while working for WINS in New York City. A great rivalry developed during this time between Alan Freed and Dick Clark who appears in this film. Freed was the pioneer of rock and roll movies (Rock Around the Clock; Don't Knock the Rock; Rock, Rock, Rock), however, U.S. Congressional Hearings into payola practices and radio broadcasting eventually ruined Freed's career, while Clark's career continued uninterrupted.

Jamboree was essentially a music film in the manner of music videos that followed many years later on MTV where the story was secondary to the musical performances, with the amateurish acting becoming less relevant than the musical performances. However, this movie is of historical importance due to the performances by various musical acts.

Featured stars
Included in Jamboree are Buddy Knox, who performs "Hula Love", a no. 9 hit on the Billboard pop singles chart; Jimmy Bowen, performs "Cross Over"; Dick Clark acting as the host for a show within the film, which was released shortly after first who appearing as host of American Bandstand on TV; Fats Domino, who performs "Wait and See"; Charlie Gracie (who became an even bigger hit in the UK than he was in the United States), who performs "Cool Baby"; Jack Jackson (British bandleader who acted as the disc jockey host of the Decca records show on Radio Luxembourg; Jerry Lee Lewis (who performs "Great Balls of Fire" in a version that is different from the Sun 45 release); Lewis Lymon and the Teenchords; Jack Payne (another British band leader); Carl Perkins (who sings "Glad All Over"); Jodie Sands, who performs "Sayonara"; Frankie Avalon, who sings "Teacher's Pet"; Slim Whitman, who gathered a tremendous following in Europe, who performs "Unchain My Heart"; Aaron Schroeder as the Songwriter; The Four Coins, who perform "A Broken Promise"; and, Count Basie and His Orchestra, featuring Joe Williams on vocals. Connie Francis overdubbed her vocals for Freda Holloway.

Brazilian singer Cauby Peixoto has a cameo appearance in the film under the name Ron Coby. Cauby had a brief rock-and-roll phase is in his career, recording "Rock'n'Roll in Copacabana".

Dick Clark is the host of the "second hour" of a "United Charities" telethon to raise money to fight what is described only as "this dreaded disease". Clark is listed as a DJ for WFIL Philadelphia in the credits (at the time, he also hosted the original Philadelphia edition of what eventually became American Bandstand). Clark introduces a number of disc jockeys from across the U.S. and Canada. These DJs then introduce the featured stars. Later in the film, Jack Jackson (ATV) and Chris Payne (BBC) in London, Werner Goetze (Bayerischer Rundfunk) in Munich, and Chris Howland (Westdeutscher Rundfunk) in Cologne, Germany are shown introducing "Pete and Honey" records on the air. Finally, performances are the entertainment at a convention of the Music Operators of America, a group of jukebox owners that bought 150 records per week in the 1950s.

Cast

 Alan Freed as Disc-jockey
 Fats Domino as Himself
 Jerry Lee Lewis as Himself
 Jimmy Bowen as Himself
 Jack Jackson as Himself
 Buddy Knox as Himself
 Charlie Gracie as Himself
 Joe Williams as Himself
 Jodie Sands as Herself
 Frankie Avalon as Himself
 Lewis Lymon and the Teenchords as Teen Group Band
 Slim Whitman as Himself
 Carl Perkins as Himself
 Jack Payne as Himself
 Andy Martin as Himself
 Aaron Schroeder as Songwriter
 The Four Coins as Singing Group
 Cauby Peixoto as Ron Coby
 Rocco and his Saints as Rock band
 Connie Francis as Herself
 Kay Medford as Gracie Show
 Robert Pastene as Lew Arthur
 Paul Carr as Peter Porter
 Freda Holloway as Honey Wynn
 David King-Wood as Warren Sykes
 Jean Martin as Cindy Sykes, Asst. Mgr.
 Tony Travis as Stage Manager
 Leonard Schneider as Asst. Stage Mgr.
 Ed Bonner as Disc-jockey, St. Louis
 Joe Finan as Disc-jockey, Cleveland
 Dick Clark as Disc-jockey, Philadelphia
 Milt Grant as Disc-jockey, Washington
 Jocko Henderson as Disc-jockey, New York

See also
 List of American films of 1957

References

External links

1957 films
1957 musical films
American black-and-white films
American musical films
American rock music films
Films scored by Neal Hefti
Warner Bros. films
1950s English-language films
1950s American films